Levi Redfern (18 February 1905 – 1976) was an English footballer, who played for York City, Huddersfield Town and Bradford City. He was born in Burton upon Trent.

References

1905 births
English footballers
Sportspeople from Burton upon Trent
Association football defenders
York City F.C. players
Huddersfield Town A.F.C. players
Bradford City A.F.C. players
English Football League players
Midland Football League players
1976 deaths
FA Cup Final players